This is a list of some long-distance footpaths used for walking and hiking.

Africa

Namibia
Fish River Canyon:  route in the ǀAi-ǀAis/Richtersveld Transfrontier Park

South Africa
Otter Trail:  section of the Garden Route along the Cape coast
Drakensberg Grand Traverse: rugged  trek in KwaZulu-Natal

Egypt
Sinai Trail:  thru-hike from Nuweiba to Mount Catherine

Uganda 

 Sir Samuel and Lady Florence Baker Trail: 575 km (357 mi) trek through northern Uganda

Asia

Bangladesh
Jhiri Path: ascent of Keokradong, one of the highest mountains in Bangladesh.

Bhutan
Snowman Trek:  trek through high passes near the border with Tibet

Hong Kong
Lantau Trail:  on Lantau Island
Wilson Trail:  from Stanley, Hong Kong Island to Nam Chung, New Territories
MacLehose Trail:  from Sai Kung to Tuen Mun

Georgia

Transcaucasian Trail:  of trail over Georgia and Armenia

India
Great Lakes Trek: , Himalayan trek, from Sonamarg to Naranag.
The Dang: , The route follows the path of the King of the Dangs, from his residence to the Mount Mary Steps via his favourite den at the foot of his Sea Breeze residence.

Israel
Israel National Trail:  from Dan to Eilat, covering many historic and scenic points
Jerusalem Trail:  trail, connecting the Israel National Trail with Jerusalem
Jesus Trail:  in the Galilee region, connecting important sites from the life of Jesus. The trail begins in Nazareth and passes through Sepphoris, Cana, the horns of Hattin, Arbel Cliffs, Capernaum, Tabgha, the Mount of Beatitudes, the Jordan River, and Mount Tabor.
Golan Trail:  from Mt. Hermon to the Sea of Galilee
Sea to sea trail:  from the sea of Galilee to the Mediterranean Sea
Valley of the springs Trail (Emek HaMaayanot):  around the Valley of springs near the Sea of Galilee
Haifa Wadis Trail:  trail connecting the Israel National Trail with Haifa and its surroundings

Japan

Hokkaidō Nature Trail:  all over the island of Hokkaidō (in planning)
Tōhoku Nature Trail:  within Aomori, Iwate, Miyagi, Akita, Yamagata and Fukushima prefectures
Chubu Hokuriku Nature Trail:  within Gunma, Niigata, Toyama, Ishikawa, Fukui, Nagano, Gifu and Shiga prefectures
Kantō Fureai Trail:  within Ibaraki, Tochigi, Gunma, Saitama, Chiba, Tōkyō and Kanagawa prefectures. Also known as the Capital Region Nature Trail.
Tōkaidō Nature Trail:  from Tokyo to Osaka via Kanagawa, Yamanashi, Shizuoka, Aichi, Shiga, Gifu, Mie, Kyōto and Nara prefectures
Kinki Nature Trail:  within Fukui, Mie, Shiga, Kyōto, Osaka, Hyōgo, Nara, Wakayama and Tottori prefectures
Chugoku Nature Trail:  within Tottori, Shimane, Okayama, Hiroshima and Yamaguchi prefectures
Shikoku Nature Trail:  within Ehime, Tokushima, Kagawa and Kōchi prefectures
Kyushu Nature Trail:  within Fukuoka, Saga, Nagasaki, Kumamoto, Oita, Miyazaki and Kagoshima prefectures
Michinoku Coastal Trail:  within Aomori, Iwate, Miyagi and Fukushima prefectures

Japan is also home to several lengthy pilgrimage routes, such as the  Shikoku Pilgrimage that visits 88 temples and Mount Kōya. Today these temples and shrines are easily accessible by car and mass transit, but many visitors choose to walk the traditional routes.

Jordan

Lebanon
Lebanon Mountain Trail, a 26-day  trail through Mount Lebanon

Myanmar
Hkakabo Razi Trail, climbing the highest peak in Myanmar, in Khakaborazi National Park, and various footpaths in Putao

Nepal

Trek to Everest Base Camp, an 18-day trail to the base camp of Mt. Everest
 Annapurna Circuit, a 3-week loop trek through the Annapurna range
 Manaslu Circuit Trek, a 3-week loop trek through the adjacent range to the Annapurna region—the Manaslu region. (see Manaslu Circuit at WikiVoyage)
The Great Himalaya Trail is a proposed  trail from Namche Barwa, Tibet to Nanga Parbat, Pakistan, with sections in Bhutan, China, and India. It uses existing trails, many of which are trekking, trade, or pilgrimage routes, but no new trails have been built.

Russia
Great Baikal Trail
Frolikha Adventure Coastline Track F.A.C.T.:  trail at the northern tip of Lake Baikal

South Korea
 The Baekdudaegan Trail:  along the ridge of the Baekdudaegan range, Korea's watershed divide 
 The Jeju Olle:  series of connected walking courses about the coastline of Jeju Island

Turkey

Sufi Trail –  trail from Istanbul to Konya, following the Ottoman Sultans Hajj route
Lycian Way –  trail around the south coast of Turkey
Saint Paul Trail –  trail following St Paul's 1st journey
Sultans Trail runs  from Vienna through the Balkans, terminating in Istanbul
Kackar Trails – 8 multi-day trails in Northeast Turkey
Evliya Çelebi Way – the first part of Evliya's route to Mecca in the 17th century
Phrygian Way –  route around the Phrygian Valleys near Ankara
Carian Trail –  hugging the south-west coast of Turkey

Europe
Some other popular international routes include: 
GR (Grande Randonnée) footpaths in Belgium, France, Spain and the Netherlands
Tour du Mont Blanc, circling the Mont Blanc massif in Italy, Switzerland, and France.
Haute Randonnée Pyrénéenne (HRP),  along the length of the Pyrenees in France, Spain and Andorra
Nordkalottleden Trail (Kalottireitti),  in the northernmost parts of Finland, Sweden, and Norway (Lapland)
St James's Way (Camino de Santiago de Compostela),with  commonly walked through France and Spain, but also including old pilgrimage routes from as far afield as Poland and Portugal
Peaks of the Balkans Trail,  through Montenegro, Albania and Kosovo
 Sultans Trail in Austria, Slovakia, Hungary, Croatia, Serbia, Romania, Bulgaria, Greece, and Turkey
 The Via Alpina network of Alpine trails
 Red Trail 
Violet Trail
Yellow Trail
Green Trail
Blue Trail
Via Francigena from Canterbury to Rome
 :it:Tratturo L'Aquila-Foggia from L'Aquila (Abruzzo region, Italy) to Foggia (Puglia region, Italy). At , Tratturo Magno is the longest and the most important ancient route, traversed by shepherds in Transhumance
The Via Dinarica from Slovenia to Montenegro via the Dinaric Alps connects Croatia, Bosnia and Herzegovina and Montenegro. The trail connects with Kosovo and Albania via the High Scardus Trail.

Austria

The "10 great Austrian long-distance trails"
North Alpine Trail 01 from Vienna or Lake Neusiedl to Lake Constance
Central Alpine Trail 02 from Hainburg an der Donau to Feldkirch
South Alpine Trail 03 from Bad Radkersburg to Sillian
Pre-Alpine Trail 04 from Vienna to Salzburg and continued via Bavaria to Bregenz
Nord-South-Trail 05 from Nebelstein to Eibiswald
Pilgrimage Trails to Mariazell 06 connecting Eisenstadt, Vienna, Nebelstein, Linz, Salzburg, Klagenfurt and Eibiswald with Mariazell
East-Austrian Borderland Trail 07 from Nebelstein to Bad Radkersburg
Eisenwurzentrail 08 connecting the northernmost and the southernmost points of Austria
Salzsteig Trail 09 following an old salt smugglers' route from Sternstein to Arnoldstein
Ruperti Trail 10 from Bärenstein to Nassfeld

Other important trails
Arnoweg around the state of Salzburg
Alpe Adria Trail, Austria, Slovenia, Italy

Bulgaria
Kom-Emine , from Mount Kom to Cape Emine (part of European walking route E3)

Czechia
Polish - Czech Friendship Trail: trail along the Polish and Czech border in Sudetes
Stezka Českem:First Official Czech Thru-Hike Trail 1,000-kilometer

Denmark
Hærvejen, an ancient trail on the Jutland Peninsula.
Øhavsstien  around the archipelago of southern Denmark Fünen.
Gendarmstien,  following the border between Germany and Denmark.
Bornholm Rundt. A walk around of the island of Bornholm.
Camønoen A walk on the island of Møn.
Sjællandsleden is a trail around Sjælland.
Kyst til kyst stien A 140 km long hike across Jutland from Blåvandshuk to Vejle Map

Estonia 
 Peraküla-Aegviidu-Ähijärve,  from North-East to South-West Estonia
 Oandu-Aegviidu-Ikla,  from North to South Estonia

Finland
The Karhunkierros Trail (External link) in the municipalities of Kuusamo and Salla, Oulanka National Park, Lapland
The Peuran polku Trail: (External link) in the municipalities of Kivijärvi, Kinnula, Perho, Lestijärvi and Reisjärvi in Central Finland, Central Ostrobothnia, and Northern Ostrobothnia—a part of European walking route E6

France
 Sentier de Grande Randonnée (GR)
 Haute Randonnée Pyrénéenne (HRP): High Pyrenees Trail, along the border with Spain.
 The Tour du Lot: a circuit of over  around the Department of the Lot's periphery.
 Sentier Métropolitain: urban and suburban hiking routes, that allow their users to discover a metropolitan territory in several days of hiking.
 Hexatrek: a 3000km trail linking France's main mountain ranges.

Germany
 Barbarossaweg: Korbach to Kyffhäuserdenkmal
 Bergischer Weg: Essen to Königswinter
 Birkenhainer Strasse: Hanau to Gemünden am Main
 Bonifatiusweg: Mainz to Fulda
 Christine-Koch-Weg: Menden to Bad Laasphe
 Eselsweg: Schlüchtern to Großheubach
König-Ludwig-Weg: Berg am Starnberger See to Füssen
Maximiliansweg: Lindau to Berchtesgaden
Moselhöhenweg:  Trier to Koblenz
Pandurensteig:  Waldmuenchen to Passau
Rennsteig:  Hörsel to Blankenstein/Saale through the Thuringian Forest
Rheinburgenweg Trail:  Bingen to Koblenz to Rüdesheim am Rhein (c.)
Rheinhöhenweg Trail:  Bonn to Alsheim/Wiesbaden
Rheinsteig:  Bonn to Wiesbaden
Westweg (Black Forest western ridgeway): Pforzheim to Basel
Mittelweg (Black Forest central ridgeway):  Pforzheim to Waldshut
Ostweg (Black Forest eastern ridgeway): Pforzheim to Schaffhausen
Black Forest North Perimeter Way:  Mühlacker to Karlsruhe
Two Valleys Trail:  round hiking trail from/to Waldkirch

 Freiburg-Lake Constance Black Forest Trail: Freiburg to Konstanz
Saar-Hunsrück-Steig: Trier to Saarschleife in Mettlach or Idar-Oberstein 9
Westfalenwanderweg: Hattingen to Altenbergen

Greece
European walking route E4 (Florina to Agios Nikolaos)
European walking route E6 (Igoumenitsa to Alexandroupoli)

Hungary
National Blue Trail:  connecting several World Heritage Sites

Iceland
Laugavegur:  from Landmannalaugar to Skógar via Thórsmörk mountain ridge

Italy

 Grand Italian Trail (Sentiero Italia): nationwide trail of more than  length
Via Francigena: pilgrimage route across Italy to Rome from France
Emilia-Romagna: Via degli Dei is a path  that crosses the Apennines from Bologna to Florence.
 Dolomites:
Dolomites Classical High Route (no.1) from Braies Lake to Belluno
High Route of the Legends (no.2) from Brixen to Feltre
Dolomites High Route of the Chamoi (no.3) from Villabassa to Longarone
Dolomites Grohmann's High Route (no.4) from San Candido in Pusteria to Pieve di Cadore
Dolomites Titans's High Route (no.5) from Sesto in Pusteria to Pieve di Cadore
Dolomites High Route of Silence (no.6) from Pieve d'Alpago to Vittorio Veneto
Dolomites Patera's High Route (no.7) from Ponte nelle Alpi to Tambre d'Alpago
Dolomites High Route of the Heroes (no.8) from Feltre to Bassano del Grappa
Dolomites High Route (n. 9): the Trasversale from Bolzano to Santo Stefano di Cadore
Dolomites High Route (n. 10) of Giudicarie from Bolzano to the Garda Lake
 Liguria:
Liguria: From Portovenere to Camogli hiking trail along the sea
Alta Via dei Monti Liguri
Sentiero Azzurro is a trail along a rugged portion of coast on the Italian Riviera that connects the five towns known as the Cinque Terre in Liguria, Italy
 Lombardy
Il Sentiero del Viandante The "Wayfarer's trail" from Lecco to Colico on the east side of Lake Como.
Il Sentiero delle 4 Valli The "Four Valleys Path" between Lake Como and Lake Lugano
La Via dei Monti Lariani: The Monti Lariani trail on the west side of Lake Como, from Cernobbio to Sorico 
 Piedmont
Grande Traversata delle Alpi (GTA): 55 days in the Alps of Piedmont
 Tuscany
 Grande Escursione Appenninica (Great Apennines Walk): largely along the ridge of the Apennine Mountains
Sardinia
Selvaggio Blu
 Sicily
 Magna Via Francigena: from Palermo to Agrigento

Montenegro
Primorska planinarska transverzala (Coastal Mountain Transversal), from Herceg Novi to Bar, 
Crnogorska Transverzala (Montenegrin Transversal), from Durmitor to Kučka Krajina,

Netherlands

Zevenwoudenpad from Lauwersoog to Steenwijk
Pionierspad from Steenwijk to Muiden
Floris V-pad from Amsterdam to Bergen op Zoom
Trekvogelpad from Bergen aan Zee to Enschede
Marskramerpad from Bad Bentheim to Den Haag
Maarten van Rossumpad from 's-Hertogenbosch to Ommen
Deltapad from Sluis to Hook of Holland
Hollands Kustpad from Hook of Holland to Den Helder
Friese Kustpad from Stavoren to Lauwersoog
Wad- en Wierdenpad from Lauwersoog to Nieuweschans
Oeverloperpad from Rotterdam Europoort to Leerdam
Lingepad from Leerdam to Nijmegen (German border)
Pelgrimspad from Amsterdam to Maastricht
Zuiderzeepad from Enkhuizen to Stavoren
Pieterpad from Pieterburen to the Sint Pietersberg
Noaberpad from Nieuweschans to Emmerich
Grenslandpad from Sluis to Thorn
Overijssels Havezatenpad from Oldenzaal to Steenwijk
Peellandpad from 's-Hertogenbosch to Roermond
 Airbornepad from the Belgian border to Arnhem

Norway
Jotunheimen Trail (Norwegian: "Jotunheimstien"):  from downtown Oslo to Lake Gjende in Jotunheimen
Nordkalottruta (Finnish: Kalottireitti, Swedish: Nordkalottleden):  from Kautokeino (located in Finnmark, Northern Norway) to Sulitjelma (Norway) or alternately Kvikkjokk (Sweden)

Poland 
Główny Szlak Sudecki (Main Sudety Trail):  in Sudetes Mountains from Świeradów Zdrój to Prudnik
Główny Szlak Beskidzki (Main Beskidy Trail):  in Beskids Mountains, from Wołosate to Ustroń, the longest public trail in Poland
Polish - Czech Friendship Trail: trail along the Polish and Czech border in Sudetes

Portugal 

 Fisherman's Trail:  along the cliffs of southern Portugal

Republic of Ireland

Serbia
 The Fruška Gora Transversal (Serbian: Fruškogorska Transverzala) – circular trail around Fruška Gora mountain – 160 km (100 mi)
 The Small Toplica Transversal (Serbian: Mala Toplička Transverzala) –

Slovakia
The Slovak National Uprising Heroes Trail  from Dukla Pass to Devín across mountainous regions of Slovakia

Slovenia
Slovenian Mountain Hiking Trail  from east (Maribor) to west (Ankaran)

Spain

Way of St. James (Spanish: El Camino de Santiago)
 Route of the Monasteries of Valencia (Spanish: Ruta de los Monasterios de Valencia)
 Grande Randonnée 7 (GR 7): From Tarifa to the mountain cabin of Fontferrera, part of the E4 route.
 Grande Randonnée 11 (GR 11): Pyrenees Trail, staying within Spain.
 Haute Randonnée Pyrénéenne (HRP): High Pyrenees Trail, along the border with France.
 O Camiño dos Faros (The Lighthouse Way):  along the coastline from Malpica to Fisterra, in Galicia (Spain)

Sweden
Kungsleden,  from the northern extremity of the country
Sörmlandsleden  of winding paths through the county of Sörmland.
Bohusleden  past at Göteborg, Uddevalla, Munkedal and ends finally in Strömstad
 Ingegerdsleden, pilgrimage route in county of Uppland between Uppsala Cathedral and Stockholm Cathedral.
Part of the North Sea Trail.

Switzerland

United Kingdom

Some of the best-known National Trails in England and Wales include:

 Cleveland Way,  in the moors of North Yorkshire
 Offa's Dyke Path,  along the Anglo–Welsh border
 Pembrokeshire Coast Path,  through the Pembrokeshire Coast National Park in southeast Wales
 Pennine Way,  through northern England to the Scottish border
 South West Coast Path,  along the Devon and Cornwall coasts

Scotland's Great Trails is a network of 29 paths primarily used by hikers.

North America

Canada

 The Trans-Canada Trail is a trail system of over  extending throughout Canada

Western Canada 
Alexander MacKenzie Heritage Trail (or Blackwater Trail),  in British Columbia
Chilkoot Trail,  in British Columbia and Alaska, USA
Great Divide Trail,  in the Canadian Rockies straddling Alberta and British Columbia
Juan de Fuca Trail and West Coast Trail  on Vancouver Island, BC
Monkman Pass Memorial Trail,  in British Columbia
Sunshine Coast Trail,  in British Columbia

Ontario 
Bruce Trail,  via the Niagara Escarpment through southern Ontario
Capital Pathway,  around the National Capital Region
La Cloche Silhouette Trail,  in the La Cloche Mountains of Killarney Provincial Park
Rideau Trail,  linking Ottawa and Kingston
Voyageur Hiking Trail,  along the coastlines of Lakes Superior and Huron
Mantario Trail,  in southeastern Manitoba and Ontario

Quebec 
Sentier des Caps, 
Traversée de Charlevoix, 
Vallée Bras-du-Nord,

Atlantic Canada 
East Coast Trail,  in Newfoundland
Fundy Footpath,  in New Brunswick
International Appalachian Trail,  from the US border via New Brunswick, the Gaspé Peninsula, and through Newfoundland and Labrador by ferry

Greenland

Panama
TransPanama Trail,

United States 
Three famous north–south trails spanning the USA comprise the Triple Crown of Hiking:
 Continental Divide Trail,  running from Mexico to Canada through New Mexico, Colorado, Wyoming, Idaho, and Montana
 Pacific Crest Trail,  from Mexico to Canada via the Sierra Nevada and Cascade ranges of the West Coast

Other popular trails include:

 John Muir Trail in central California, mostly along the Pacific Crest Trail in the central Sierra, 
 Tahoe Rim Trail in California and Nevada, 
 Long Trail through Vermont, 
 Pacific Northwest Trail from the Washington coast to the North American continental divide in Montana, 
 Colorado Trail from southwestern Colorado to the Denver suburbs, 
 Arizona Trail running the length of the state north - south, 
 Ouachita National Recreation Trail in Oklahoma and Arkansas, 
 River to River Trail in southern Illinois, 
 Florida Trail running the length of the state,  built with some  planned

Oceania

Australia

New Zealand

Te Araroa,  Stretching from Cape Reinga in the north of New Zealand to Bluff in the South.
New Zealand Great Walks, ten popular backcountry hikes

Central and South America

Argentina
Los Glaciares
 Various options to Laguna Torre, Cerro FitzRoy, or even out onto the Southern Patagonian Ice Field
Huella Andina
  from Alumine Lake to Baggilt lake

Bolivia
Cordillera Real (Bolivia)
  7-day Illampu Circuit

Brazil
Transmantiqueira Trail
 crosses the Mantiqueira range in a west–east direction (very hard trail)
Petrópolis Teresópolis Traverse
  between Petrópolis and Teresópolis (medium to hard trail)
Transcarioca Trail
 in Rio de Janeiro city (medium to hard trail)
Caminho da Fé
 . There are 3 different starting points: 
 from Sao Carlos to Aparecida, São Paulo
 or from Cravinhos to Aparecida
 or from Mococa to Aparecida

Costa Rica
280 km from Atlantic to Pacific coasts of Costa Rica

• El Camino de Costa Rica

Chile
Central Chile and Patagonia 
 Greater Patagonian Trail from the capital Santiago de Chile to the Southern Patagonian Ice Field.
Magallanes
. Full circuit of Torres del Paine, including Valle del Francés and access to the base of Torres del Paine.
Dientes de Navarino Circuit ≈. 3‑7 days. Starts out of Puerto Williams. Access from mainland Chile by ferry from Punta Areas, plane or from Ushuaia. http://rutas.bienes.cl/wp-content/uploads/2015/01/01.pdf

Peru

Cordillera Blanca and Huayhuash mountain range near Huaráz
 10- to 14-day trek on the Huayhuash Circuit
 3- to 4-day "W" Circuit Santa Cruz trek
 6- to 10-day Alpamayo Circuit, full "O" Circuit
Sacred Valley & Vilcanota mountain range near Cuzco
 for the longest Mollepata variant of the Inca trail, with options for a single day to more than six days, all ending at Machu Picchu
 Cachora to Choquequirao trek
 5- to 6-day trek on Ausangate Circuit
Colca Canyon near Arequipa
 5-day trek around Canyon or other single-day and multi-day hikes

References

Nature-related lists